The lesser weever (Echiichthys vipera) is a venomous weever of the family Trachinidae, in the order Perciformes, and the class Actinopterygii. It is generally found on the sandy sea beds of the open sea, near the shore. Lesser weevers may sting swimmers badly if disturbed in the water, and fishermen when they clean their fishing nets.

The lesser weever grows up to 18 cm long, but generally less than 15 cm, with an elongated body. Its color can be described as greyish-brown on the back and silvery-white on the sides. It has no spines in front of its eyes.

Habitat

Lesser weever fish occur in the eastern Atlantic from the North Sea around the British Isles to Morocco and Madeira, and in the Mediterranean. It is typically found resting on the bottom, partially buried with its  eyes and tip of the first dorsal fin exposed.

Biology

The lesser weever is littoral and benthic, living on sandy, muddy bottoms, ranging from a few meters deep to 150 m (in winter). Resting on the bottom, its position can be described as with eyes buried and the tip of the first dorsal fin exposed. Because of its venom and its occurrence near beaches, it is considered to be one of Europe's most dangerous weever species. The venom glands are located on its first dorsal fin, which is completely black, and on the gill cover. This species has the most potent toxin of all the weevers. The venom contains a cytolysin, trachinine, as well as serotonin, histamine-realising substances and various enzymes.

Effect on humans

The sting of a weever causes acute and intense pain, which is frequently radiated to the area around the limb.  The  pain intensity reaches its peak 30 minutes after the sting, and then slowly decreases, but some pain (or other sensation, such as a tingle) may continue to affect the area for up to 24 hours. Very rarely, pain can be propagated to the tributary lymph nodes, i.e. those in the groin (when the sting is on the sole of the foot), or those in the armpit (if the sting is on the hands).

The best first aid is to wash the wound, and then to immerse it in very hot water for at least an hour, to ease the pain and help destroy the protein-based venom. Water temperature for immersion should be  40°C (104°F) or as hot as the patient can tolerate. Also, reassure the patient of the relative harmlessness of the sting.

See also

 Greater weever
 Weever

References

External links

 More detailed Description
 Wonders of Weeverfish
 Other hazardous fish

lesser weever
Venomous fish
Fish of the East Atlantic
Fish of the Mediterranean Sea
Fish of the North Sea
Marine fish of Europe
lesser weever
Taxa named by Georges Cuvier